Ivar Jenner (born 10 January 2004) is a professional footballer who plays as a midfielder for Jong Utrecht. Born in the Netherlands, he is a youth international for Indonesia.

Personal life
Born in Utrecht, Ivar is a footballer of Indonesian descent. Ivar's Indonesian descent comes from his grandmother, the mother of his father who was born in Java.

In an interview he said, "My father's mother or my grandmother was born in Java (Jember). So, my father is half Indonesian and I am a quarter Indonesian. My mother's parents are from Netherlands. So my Dutch side came from my mother".

Club career
Ivar played for IJsselstein-based academy side IJFC and Ajax before a move to Utrecht in 2016. He signed his first professional contract in May 2021.

International career
Ivar has represented the Netherlands at under-15 level.

He is also eligible to represent Indonesia, and in October 2022, he travelled with fellow Dutch-Indonesian footballer Justin Hubner to Indonesia to become naturalized, in order to represent the Indonesia national under-20 football team at the 2023 AFC Asian Cup and the 2023 FIFA U-20 World Cup.

Although Ivar still holds the Netherlands passport, on 17 November 2022, he played for the Indonesia U-20 in a losing effort, 0–6 against France U-20 in a friendly match in Spain. He also played against Slovakia U-20 two days later, in a 1–2 lost.

Career statistics

Club

Notes

References

2004 births
Living people
Footballers from Utrecht (city)
Indonesian footballers
Indonesia youth international footballers
Dutch footballers
Netherlands youth international footballers
Dutch people of Indonesian descent
Indonesian people of Dutch descent
Association football midfielders
Eerste Divisie players
AFC Ajax players
FC Utrecht players
Jong FC Utrecht players